The Symphony No. 2 is a three-movement symphony for orchestra by the American composer Stephen Albert.  The work was commissioned by the New York Philharmonic for their sesquicentennial anniversary.  However, the piece had to be completed posthumously by the composer Sebastian Currier after Albert died suddenly in a car crash on December 27, 1992.  The first performance took place November 10, 1994 with the New York Philharmonic conducted by Hugh Wolff.  Albert's previous Symphony No. 1 RiverRun had won the Pulitzer Prize for Music in 1985.

Composition

Structure
The symphony has a duration of approximately thirty minutes and is composed in three movements:
Allegro
Adagio
Allegro

Currier's contribution
Fellow composer and music critic Steve Schwartz wrote about the work:

Reception
In reviewing the work, Schwartz compared the piece favorably to Albert's Symphony No. 1, saying, "Albert resorts to ostinatos less and concentrates on counterpoint more."  Schwartz added, "The symphony runs tighter than its sibling, with an increase of power, as well as clearer, with a corresponding jump in tension."

References

 2
1992 compositions
Compositions for symphony orchestra
Music commissioned by the New York Philharmonic
Albert